The following is a list of episodes for the second season of Sunrise' Aikatsu! anime television series, which aired on TV Tokyo between October 3, 2013 and September 25, 2014. After Ichigo takes a year-long break to train in America, she returns to find another idol school, Dream Academy, has appeared, bringing with it new rivals and friends. From episodes 76-101, the opening theme is "SHINING LINE*" by Waka, Fūri, and Yuna, whilst the ending theme is "Precious" by Risuko, Waka, Fūri, and Mona.

Episodes

References

2013 Japanese television seasons
Aikatsu!
Aikatsu! episode lists